The Walsall North by-election on 4 November 1976 was held after the resignation of sitting Member of Parliament (MP) John Stonehouse. Elected as a Labour candidate, Stonehouse was a member of the English National Party when he resigned, after an interlude in which he faked his own death.  The English National Party did not contest the by-election, the first occasion on which the incumbent's party did not do so since the 1963 Bristol South East by-election, and the last until the 1995 North Down by-election.

Amidst the confusion, the Conservative Party gained the seat in the by-election.

The by-election was also noted for the performance of independent candidate Sidney Wright, the debut of the Ecology Party and the split of the far right vote due to the appearance of both the National Front and their splinter group the National Party on the ballots.  The Liberal Party could take only fifth place, their worst ever placing in a by-election in England.  The party had previously come fifth in Wales in the 1972 Merthyr Tydfil by-election, and next placed so low at the 1989 Glasgow Central by-election.

The by-election also saw a record number of candidates, beating the long-standing record of seven who contested the 1920 Stockport by-election, where two seats were available, a total first reached in a single-member by-election in the 1962 Dorset South by-election.  This record was again beaten at the 1977 City of London and Westminster South by-election.

Joseph Parker, the National Front candidate, would go on to be father-in-law to John Tyndall, the leader of the National Front, after Tyndall married Parker's daughter Valerie in 1977.

Results

See also
 United Kingdom by-election records

References

1976 elections in the United Kingdom
By-elections to the Parliament of the United Kingdom in West Midlands (county) constituencies
Politics of Walsall
1976 in England
1970s in the West Midlands (county)
November 1976 events in the United Kingdom